Patrick James Lenihan (4 September 1902 – 11 March 1970) was an Irish Fianna Fáil politician who served as a Teachta Dála (TD) for the Longford–Westmeath constituency from 1965 to 1970.

He held the distinction of being the only parent to be elected to the Oireachtas where his child was already a member.

Early life
He was born 4 September 1902 in Ennistymon, County Clare, son of Patrick Lenihan, a teacher, and Hannah Lenihan (née McIherney). He was educated at Garbally College, Ballinasloe, and University College Galway, he graduated a year late because of his involvement with the IRA during the Irish War of Independence. Following graduation he taught at Christian Brothers' schools in Belfast for two years. 

He was an Inspector of Taxes in Dundalk, County Louth, before being appointed by Seán Lemass to run the Gentex textiles company in Athlone. At its height it was the major employer in the Midlands. He also was involved for some years in the Hodson Bay Hotel on Lough Ree, and was instrumental in the establishment of the All-Ireland amateur drama festival. In the 1930s, he served on the executive committee of the Irish Social Credit Party, fellow members of which included Maud Gonne.

He also had some success as a hurler with Westmeath during the 1930s. He won a Leinster Junior Hurling Championship and an All-Ireland Junior Hurling Championship in 1936. The following year he played in (to date) Westmeath's only Leinster Senior Hurling Championship final, in which they lost out to Kilkenny.

Politics
He was elected as a Fianna Fáil TD at his first attempt, for the Longford–Westmeath constituency at the 1965 general election. He beat the long-serving Fine Gael TD Seán Mac Eoin in the famous "long count", by thirteen votes. His son Brian Lenihan had been elected in the neighbouring constituency of Roscommon in 1961, at the previous election. It was the first, and to date only, occasion of a child preceding his parent into the Dáil. Patrick Lenihan was re-elected to the Dáil at the 1969 general election and died suddenly in 1970. His seat was taken at the subsequent by-election by Fine Gael's Patrick Cooney who subsequently went on to serve as a Minister.

Two of his children, Brian Lenihan Snr and Mary O'Rourke, served as Irish cabinet ministers. A third, Paddy, served as a member of Roscommon County Council; in the later stages of his career in the 1980s, he left Fianna Fáil to join Neil Blaney's Independent Fianna Fáil. Two of Patrick Lenihan's grandchildren, Brian Lenihan Jnr and Conor Lenihan, served as Minister for Finance and Minister of State respectively in the government of Brian Cowen. Conor Lenihan and Mary O'Rourke lost their seats at the 2011 general election. Brian Lenihan Jnr was re-elected but died in June 2011, ending the Lenihans' fifty years of continuous service in the Oireachtas.

Patrick Lenihan was the only member of his family to serve in the Dáil who was not appointed a Minister at some stage in his career.

See also
Families in the Oireachtas

References

1902 births
1970 deaths
Fianna Fáil TDs
Irish sportsperson-politicians
Members of the 18th Dáil
Members of the 19th Dáil
Patrick
Alumni of the University of Galway
Politicians from County Clare
Politicians from County Westmeath
Westmeath inter-county hurlers
People educated at Garbally College